Siegfried I may refer to:

Siegfried of Luxembourg (922–998), first count of Luxembourg
Siegfried I, Count of Sponheim (c. 1010 – 1065)
Siegfried I (Archbishop of Mainz) (died 1084)
Siegfried I, Prince of Anhalt-Zerbst (c. 1230 – 1298)